Livia Bloom Ingram (née Livia Bloom) curates cinema retrospectives. Her writing and interviews regularly appear in the film journals Cinema Scope; Filmmaker Magazine, and Film Comment. She is the editor of the book Errol Morris: Interviews. Bloom currently serves as the Vice President for Icarus Films.

Ingram has curated film programs for the Museum of the Moving Image; The Maysles Cinema in Harlem,  The French Embassy's Tournées Festival; The Nantucket Film Festival; the MPAA Student Academy Awards; and The Film Society of Lincoln Center, among other organizations.

References

Photo: http://colinmarshall.libsyn.com/index.php?post_id=579674

Year of birth missing (living people)
Living people
American literary critics
Women literary critics
American expatriates in France
American women critics